Artur Novotryasov (born 19 July 1992) is a Ukrainian professional footballer who plays as a defender for Kyran.

Career
Novotryasov is the product of the UOR Simferopol School System. In October 2012 he signed a 3-year deal with SC Tavriya Simferopol, but did not made a debut for this team and played on loan for FC Bukovyna Chernivtsi in the Ukrainian First League.

In January 2014 he signed a 4-year contract with FC Karpaty.

He also played for the Ukrainian under-19 national football team and was called up for other age level representations.

References

External links
 
 

1992 births
Living people
People from Yevpatoria
Ukrainian footballers
Association football defenders
FC Krymteplytsia Molodizhne players
SC Tavriya Simferopol players
FC Bukovyna Chernivtsi players
FC Karpaty Lviv players
FC Mariupol players
FC Chornomorets Odesa players
FC Inhulets Petrove players
FC Inhulets-2 Petrove players
FC Kyran players
Ukrainian Premier League players
Ukrainian First League players
Ukrainian Second League players
Crimean Premier League players